The Zimbabwe women's national football team is the national women's football team of Zimbabwe and is overseen by the Zimbabwe Football Association (ZIFA). As of June 2017, they are ranked 86th in the world.

Their first competitive international match was played in the 2000 African Women's Championship, when they drew against Uganda 2–2 on 11 November 2000. They actually were in the draw for the 1991 edition, but withdrew from the tournament before playing a match.

Their best result in the African Women's Championship was fourth in 2000. They have never qualified for the World Cup.

They qualified for the 2016 Olympic football tournament, and finished last in their group (containing Canada, Germany, and Australia) after losing 6–1 to Germany, 3–1 to Canada and 6–1 to Australia.

History

The beginning
Zimbabwe were slated to appear at the 1991 African Women's Championship, but withdrew before their first round match with Zambia. In June 1997 the team played South Africa at FNB Stadium in a curtain raiser to the men's Nelson Mandela Challenge. In 2003 the team's star player Yesmore Mutero publicly accused the national coach Shacky Tauro of infecting her with HIV during extramarital sex. Tauro denied the claims but abruptly left his job. Mutero died in 2004, followed by Tauro in 2009. A subsequent inquiry into allegations of widespread sexual abuse of Zimbabwe's female footballers was botched by ZIFA.

In the COSAFA Women's Championship they finished second in 2002 and fourth in 2006. In 2011 they were crowned champions.

In addition to covering up sexual abuse, ZIFA have provided inadequate and dangerous training facilities, failed to arrange preparation matches, withheld contractual payment and bonuses, refused to pay for travel to away matches and refused to pay for treatment of injured players. As a reward for qualifying for the 2016 Africa Women Cup of Nations, each player was given $50 to buy a dress. The players performed at the 2016 Olympics despite being owed $3,500 each from the association. Upon their return from Brazil, no ZIFA officials greeted the players who were given either $5 or $15 to travel home. An editorial in The Standard newspaper said: "Friday’s debacle at the airport exposed the Zifa president for what he is — a loud mouth failure who is taking Zimbabwean football to the gutter."

Results and fixtures

The following is a list of match results in the last 12 months, as well as any future matches that have been scheduled.

Legend

2023

Coaching staff

Current coaching staff

Manager history

 Shadreck Mlauzi (2015-2016)
 Sithethelelwe Sibanda (2016–present)

Players

Current squad
The following players were called up for the 2022 AFWCON qualification Second round. A preliminary squad was announced on 1 February  2022.

Caps and goals accurate up to and including 17 April 2021.

Recent call ups
The following players have been called up to the squad in the past 12 months.

Previous squads
Olympic Games
2016 Summer Olympics squad
Africa Women Cup of Nations
2000 African Women's Championship squad
2016 Africa Women Cup of Nations squad
COSAFA Women's Championship
2020 COSAFA Women's Championship squad
2021 COSAFA Women's Championship squad

Records

*Active players in bold, statistics correct as of 30 August 2021.

Most capped players

Top goalscorers

Honours

Continental
Africa Women Cup of Nations
Fourth place: 2000

Competitive record

FIFA Women's World Cup

*Draws include knockout matches decided on penalty kicks.

Olympic Games

*Draws include knockout matches decided on penalty kicks.

2016 Summer Olympics
Zimbabwe qualified for the 2016 Olympic Games after beating Zambia 2–2 on away goals, Côte d'Ivoire via a walkover, and Cameroon 2–2 on away goals. They qualified along with South Africa, who finished last in their group as well.

They were drawn into a group with Germany, Canada, and Australia, and were the only team in the women's tournament to lose all of their games.

Africa Women Cup of Nations

African Games

COSAFA Women's Championship

*Draws include knockout matches decided on penalty kicks.

Honours

All−time record against FIFA recognized nations
The list shown below shows the Djibouti national football team all−time international record against opposing nations.
*As of xxxxxx after match against  xxxx.
Key

Record per opponent
*As ofxxxxx after match against  xxxxx.
Key

The following table shows Djibouti's all-time official international record per opponent:

See also

Sport in Zimbabwe
Football in Zimbabwe
Women's football in Zimbabwe
Zimbabwe women's national football team
Zimbabwe women's national football team results
List of Zimbabwe women's international footballers
Zimbabwe men's national football team

References

External links

Zimbabwe women's national football team – official website at ZIFA 
FIFA profile

 
African women's national association football teams